Jacob Charles Robson (born November 20, 1994) is a Canadian professional baseball outfielder for the Kansas City Monarchs of the American Association of Professional Baseball. The Tigers selected Robson in the eighth round of the 2016 Major League Baseball draft. He made his MLB debut in 2021.

Career

Detroit Tigers
Robson attended Vincent Massey Secondary School in Windsor, Ontario. Playing baseball for the high school team, he batted leadoff and played center field. The San Diego Padres selected Robson in the 30th round of the 2012 Major League Baseball draft. Rather than sign with the Padres, Robson attended Mississippi State University and played college baseball for the Mississippi State Bulldogs. In 2015, he played collegiate summer baseball with the Brewster Whitecaps and Bourne Braves of the Cape Cod Baseball League, and was named a league all-star. He missed a month in 2016, his senior year, recovering from a broken bone in his hand.

The Detroit Tigers selected Robson in the eighth round of the 2016 Major League Baseball draft. He split the 2016 season between the GCL Tigers and the Connecticut Tigers, hitting a combined .294/.399/.395/.794 with one home run and 11 runs batted in (RBIs). He split the 2017 season between the West Michigan Whitecaps and the Lakeland Flying Tigers, hitting a combined .303/.380/.392/.772 with three home runs and 45 RBIs. In 2018, he began the season with the Erie SeaWolves of the Class AA Eastern League, and was promoted to the Toledo Mud Hens of the Class AAA International League. Combined between the two, he hit .295/.376/.440/.816 with 11 home runs and 47 RBIs. He spent the 2019 season with Toledo, hitting .267/.352/.399/.751 with nine home runs and 52 RBIs.

Robson hit .295/.417/.459 in 96 games split between Erie and Toledo in 2021. On August 12, 2021, Robson was called up by the Tigers and promoted to the major leagues for the first time to replace the injured Niko Goodrum. He made his major league debut that day in a game against the Baltimore Orioles. Robson went 0-for-7 in 4 big league games with Detroit and was outrighted off of the 40-man roster following the season on November 19, 2021.

Kansas City Monarchs
On July 22, 2022, the Detroit Tigers released Robson. He signed with the Kansas City Monarchs.

International career
Robson played for the Canadian national baseball team at the 2019 Pan American Games Qualifier and the 2023 World Baseball Classic.

References

External links

1994 births
Living people
Águilas Cibaeñas players
Canadian expatriate baseball players in the Dominican Republic
Baseball people from Ontario
Bourne Braves players
Brewster Whitecaps players
Canada national baseball team players
Canadian expatriate baseball players in Australia
Canadian expatriate baseball players in the United States
Connecticut Tigers players
Detroit Tigers players
Erie SeaWolves players
Estrellas Orientales players
Gulf Coast Tigers players
Lakeland Tigers players
Major League Baseball outfielders
Major League Baseball players from Canada
Mississippi State Bulldogs baseball players
Sportspeople from London, Ontario
Sportspeople from Windsor, Ontario
Sydney Blue Sox players
Toledo Mud Hens players
West Michigan Whitecaps players
2023 World Baseball Classic players